Oreoluwa Cherebin (born 24 December 1997) is a Grenadian swimmer. She competed in the 50 m and 100 m butterfly, 50 m and 100 m breaststroke events at the 2012 FINA World Swimming Championships (25 m). Cherebin also competed in the 50 m breaststroke and 50 m butterfly events at the 2013 World Aquatics Championships. She competed in the 2014 FINA World Swimming Championships (25m) as well as the 2015 and 2017 FINA World Swimming Championships. 

In 2016, she competed in the Women's 100 Butterfly at the 2016 Summer Olympics and finished second in the first heat with a recorded  time of 1:10.40s but did not progress to latter stages of the competition.

She competed in four events at the 2018 Commonwealth Games.

References

Living people
1997 births
Grenadian female swimmers
Swimmers at the 2015 Pan American Games
Pan American Games competitors for Grenada
Female butterfly swimmers
Female breaststroke swimmers
Olympic swimmers of Grenada
Swimmers at the 2016 Summer Olympics
Commonwealth Games competitors for Grenada
Swimmers at the 2018 Commonwealth Games